Birr RFC is an Irish rugby team based in Birr, County Offaly, playing in Division 2B of the Leinster League. Formed in 1887 the club is one of the oldest clubs the country. The club colours are green and black.

In June 2013 Birr rugby club won 5000 euro from Ulster bank rugby force. The Birr Under 13 team won the midlands league in the 2011-2012 season.

History

The early years

Birr RFC was first founded in 1887, the local newspaper reports on a rugby match in Chesterfield School (on the Banagher Road) between a Birr XV and a team from Galway Grammar School.

The club grew, disbanded and reformed in its early years, mainly as a result of both world wars.

The club purchased our Moorpark Grounds, consisting of 4.5 acres in the centre of Birr Town in 1963 after reforming and proceeded to win the Midland League in 1963-64 and has been in continuous existence since then.

1970s-1980s

The 1970s provided a significant chapter to rugby in Birr. During this era Birr became one of the pioneers of youth rugby in the province. A thriving underage rugby culture evolved in Birr RFRC under the guidance of a continuous stream of volunteer coaches and mentors over the intervening years and the club purchased a further 7.5 acres of land in 1975 approx 4 km south of Birr off the N52 road in Ballyeigan. Leinster Provincial honors followed at Under 15 level in 1976-77 and at Under 17 level in ‘77-78.

For many years Dooley's Hotel provided facilities for Birr RFC. In the early ‘70s the County Arms Hotel provided facilities until 1983 after a merger with the Ormond Lawn Tennis Club. A new clubhouse with meeting, changing and entertaining facilities was built, at a cost of over £150,000 with significant local fundraising, bank loans and the assistance of a Department of Education Sports Capital Grant and a Department of Labour Youth Employment Grant. Following the demise of The Ormond Lawn Tennis Club the club reverted to the Birr Rugby Club.

The club in the nineties

In 1996/97 Birr 1st XV team gained promotion from Division 4. Birr 2nd.XV won their section also in Division 4.

In 1997/98, Birr maintained Division 3 status, narrowly failing to gain promotion to Division 2. Having secured a bye in the first round of the Smithwicks Provincial Towns Cup, Birr accounted for New Ross, and Mullingar to be beaten in the semi-final by Naas, the eventual winners of the Cup.

In 1998/99, Birr for the 2nd time in its history reached the semi-finals of the Provincial Town's Cup. Again, the club was beaten, this time by Naas to a scoreline of 15 - 3. Birr's youths section embarked on their very first international tour when 39 players and eleven accompanying coaches/adults were hosted by Ellon RFC, near Aberdeen, in Scotland. The travelling party won the locally arranged tournament at both under 10's and under 12's.

Losing many of its players to retirement, the 1999/2000 season was very disappointing for the club as it was demoted to Division 4 of the Leinster League. The disappointment of the season was lifted when the club embarked on a very ambitious and successful tour to Argentina. The youth section hosted Ellon RFC at mini level. Ellon RFC won the specially commissioned CARA Cup and both club twinned at Youth level.

The new millennium

In 2000, following negotiations with the then Birr Town Council, and including an exchange of freehold and leasehold properties, Birr RFC acquired a long term lease on Council lands at Riverside. This site contains 2 full-size rugby pitches in the centre of Birr town.

Fortunes again changed as the 2000/2001 season again saw the club gaining promotion by winning Division 4. Due to the Foot & Mouth epidemic in both the UK and Ireland travel restrictions forced the cancellation of many tours including the return tour to Scotland by the mini section.

2010 - 2020's

Birr 1st XV won the Provincial Towns (J2) Plate in the 2011-12 & 2018-19 seasons.

The 2015-16 season saw the 1st introduction of Women's Rugby in Birr at Under 15 and Under 18 level.

The club has had notable success at underage level with a number of youth players representing Ireland at youth level from U18, U19 and U20's such as Peter Dooley, Shane Delahunt, Michael Milne and Jack Regan.

Peter Dooley represented Ireland at youth level including the 2014 U-20 World Cup and Six Nations, and has progressed from the Leinster academy to being a full member of the first team squad.

Shane Delahunt represented Ireland at youth level in the same years as Dooley and was also part of the Ireland squad for the 2014 Six Nations Under 20s Championship. Originally starting in the sub academy in Leinster he eventually switched to Connacht and went on to become a full member of the first team squad. Both Peter and Shane played against each other in the 2015-16 Pro 12 final.

Jack Regan played for Ireland U-19s, Leinster U-20s and Leinster 'A', as well as for UCD in the top flight of the Ulster Bank League before switching to the Ulster academy.

Chris Maloney represented the Leinster U-18 Clubs and went on to play for Ireland Youths and Aaron Browne represented Ireland at U-19 level.

Michael Milne played for Ireland U-18, U19 and in the 2019 U20 World Cup. He is current in the Leinster academy and has made his first cap for the provinces senior team.

Notable players
 Peter Dooley
 Shane Delahunt
 Michael Milne
  Jack Regan

Club honours
Provincial Towns (J2) Plate: 2011-12; 2018-19
Midland League: 1963-64

References

External links
 Birr RFC Club History

Irish rugby union teams
Rugby clubs established in 1887
Rugby union clubs in County Offaly
Birr, County Offaly